Mount Hebron is a Jewish cemetery located in Flushing, Queens, New York, United States. It was founded in 1903 as the Jewish section of Cedar Grove Cemetery, and occupies the vast majority of the grounds at Cedar Grove. The cemetery is on the former Spring Hill estate of colonial governor Cadwallader Colden. Mount Hebron is arranged in blocks, which are then split up into sections or society grounds. Sections were originally sold mainly to families or Jewish community groups such as landsmanshaftn, mutual aid societies, and burial societies. For instance, Mount Hebron is known for having a section reserved for people who worked in New York City's Yiddish theater industry.  While this type of organization is common for American Jewish cemeteries, Mount Hebron has an especially diverse range of society grounds. About 226,000 people have been buried in Mount Hebron since it opened.

There is a large Workmen's Circle section in both Cedar Grove and Mount Hebron Cemetery, with about 12,000 burials of Jewish and non-Jewish members of the Workmen's Circle.

Mount Hebron also hosts a number of Holocaust memorials erected on society grounds by Jewish immigrants. For instance, there is a large monument erected by immigrants and descendants of immigrants from the city of Grodno in what is today western Belarus. The monument is dedicated "In memoriam to our dear parents, brothers and sisters of the city of Grodno and environs who were brutally persecuted and slain by the Nazis during World War II."

Notable burials
 Celia Adler (1889–1979), Yiddish theater actress
 Henrietta Jacobson Adler (1906–1988), Yiddish theater actress
 Julius Adler (1906–1994), Yiddish theater actor
 Jules Bender (1914–1982), college basketball star
 Mina Bern (1911–2010), Yiddish theater actress
 Ben Bernie (1891–1943), bandleader and radio personality
 Max Bozyk (approx. 1899–1970), Yiddish theater actor
 Reizl Bozyk (1914–1993), Yiddish theater actress
 Paulina Lavitz Brav (1879–1959), Yiddish theater actress
 Rabbi Chaim Noach Brevda (1914–1999), Rabbi, Brighton Beach, Brooklyn
 Louis Buchalter (1897–1944), organized crime figure, boss of Murder, Inc.
 Lillian Lux Burstein (1918–2005), Yiddish theater actress
 Pesach'ke Burstein (1896–1986), Yiddish theater actor
 Louis Cohen (1904–1939), mobster
 Isidore Dollinger (1903–2000), New York State Senator and Assemblyman, U.S. Congressman, and Bronx County District Attorney
 Sergei Dovlatov (1941–1990), writer
 Alfred Eisenstaedt (1898–1995), photojournalist
 Shep Fields (1910–1981), bandleader
 Misha Fishzon (1884–1949)
 Louis D. Gibbs (1880–1929), lawyer, assemblyman, Bronx County Court judge, New York Supreme Court Justice
 Jack Gilford (1908–1990) Broadway, film and television performer
 Madeline Lee Gilford (1923–2008), film and stage actress, theatrical producer, wife of Jack Gilford
 Jennie Goldstein (1896–1960), Yiddish theater actress
 Selig Grossinger (d. 1931), founder of Grossinger's resort
 Adolph Held (1885–1969), New York City alderman, Forward editor and manager, labor activist
 Max Jacobson (1900–1979), physician often known as Dr. Feelgood
 Marvin Kaplan (1927–2016), actor
 Nathan Kaplan (1891–1923), gangster
 Alan King (1927–2004), comedian
 Harry Kopp (1880–1943), lawyer and politician
 Abraham Landau (1895–1935), mobster
 Eddie Layton (1925–2004), organist for the New York Yankees
 Aaron Lebedeff (1873–1960), Yiddish theater actor
 Fred Lebow (1932–1994), founder the New York City Marathon and president of the New York Road Runners Club
 Raphael Lemkin (1900–1959), initiator of the Genocide Convention
 Shifra Lerer (1915–2011), Yiddish theater actress
 Jeanne Manford (1920-2013), American teacher and LGBTQ+ activist
 Menashe Oppenheim (1905–1973), Yiddish theater and film actor
 Sam Paul (1874–1927), gambler, underworld figure, businessman, and political organizer
 Jack Pearl (1894–1982), vaudeville performer and radio comedian
 Nathan D. Perlman (1887–1952), U.S. congressman
 Molly Picon Kalich (1898–1992), Yiddish theater actress
 Gregory Ratoff (1893–1960), Yiddish theater and Hollywood actor and director
 Jack Rechtzeit (1903–1988), Yiddish theater actor
 Morris D. Reiss (–1949), lawyer and member of the New York State Assembly
 Miriam Kressyn Rexite (1910–1996), Yiddish theater actress and singer
 Seymour Rexite (1908–2002), Yiddish theater actor and singer
 Solomon Schechter (1847–1915), Conservative Jewish theologian
 Fred Schmertz (1888–1976), founder member of the Millrose Games and the meet director from 1934 to 1974
 Maurice Schwartz (1891–1960), Yiddish theater actor
 Ben Selvin (1898–1980), jazz musician
 William I. Sirovich (1882–1939), U.S. congressman
 Menasha Skulnik (1892–1970), Yiddish theater actor
 Bertha Kalich Spachner (died 1874–1939), Yiddish theater actress
 Thea Tewi (1902–1999), sculptor and lingerie designer
 Bessie Thomashefsky (1873–1962), Yiddish theater actress
 Boris Thomashevsky (1866–1939), Yiddish theater actor
 Emanuel Weiss (1906–1944), organized crime figure, member of Murder, Inc., and associate of Louis Buchalter
 Peter Wiernik (1865–1936), Yiddish journalist, newspaper editor, historian
 One British Commonwealth war grave, of a private of the Royal Canadian Army Medical Corps of World War I

References

External links
 Mount Hebron Cemetery website
 
 List of societies that have plots at Mount Hebron Cemetery
 New York Times Article Legal Dispute Grezinsky v. Mount Hebron Cemetery
 New York Law Journal Legal Dispute Grezinsky v. Mount Hebron Cemetery

1909 establishments in New York City
Belarusian-Jewish culture in New York City
Jewish cemeteries in New York City
Cemeteries in Queens, New York
Jews and Judaism in Queens, New York
Flushing, Queens
Kew Gardens Hills, Queens
Yiddish culture in New York City
Yiddish theatre in the United States